Cymindis nitens is a species of ground beetle in the subfamily Harpalinae. It was described by Andrewes in 1935.

References

nitens
Beetles described in 1935